In the Midst of This is the debut album by Sydney-based Australian indie rock band Expatriate. The band had previously revealed on Myspace that they hoped to have the album released by February 2007, however it was released in Australia on 21 April. It featured in the Australian ARIA album chart for one week, peaking at #38.

Artwork
The cover artwork for the album was designed and made by Jonathan Zowada who also did the artwork for the Play a Part EP. It shows a red flag blowing against the blue sky, however if you look at the picture another way, the red flag looks like a face from its side.

Track listing
 "Get Out, Give in"
 "Crazy"
 "Gotta Get Home"
 "The Spaces Between"
 "In the Night"
 "Play a Part"
 "Shooting Star"
 "You Were There"
 "Only Wanna Love Ya"
 "Deadma'"
 "Blackbird"
 "Times Like These"
 "Are You Awake?"

Charts

References

2007 debut albums
Expatriate (band) albums
Albums produced by John Goodmanson